Wilfried Klenk (born 3 Mar 1959) is a German politician (CDU) who served as President of the Landtag of Baden-Württemberg from 2015 to 2016.

Biography
Born in Oppenweiler, Klenk trained as a paramedic and was admitted to the Academy for Crisis Management, Emergency Planning and Civil Defense (de). He headed ambulance stations at Murrhardt and Backnang, and was head of the Stuttgart Rescue Service and the Oberleitstelle Baden-Württemberg. 

He has served as a municipal councillor, deputy mayor, and the CDU's chapter in Oppenweiler. From 1999-2018 he served as a district councillor in Rems-Murr-Kreis.

He has served in the Landtag of Baden-Württemberg since 2001, and was President of the Landtag of Baden-Württemberg from 2015 to 2016.

He has served in the German Red Cross since 1973. He is married with one child.

References

1959 births
Living people
People from Rems-Murr-Kreis
Christian Democratic Union of Germany politicians
Members of the Landtag of Baden-Württemberg
20th-century German politicians
21st-century German politicians
Local politicians in Germany
German city councillors
Paramedics
Red Cross personnel